Otto Fräßdorf (born 5 February 1942) is a German former footballer.

Career 

The forward which was later turned into a defender played 183 East German top-flight matches for FC Vorwärts Berlin. For the East Germany national team Fräßdorf scored 4 goals in 33 appearances.

Career statistics

International goals

References

External links
 
 
 
 

1942 births
Living people
Sportspeople from Magdeburg
German footballers
East German footballers
East Germany international footballers
Association football forwards
Olympic footballers of the United Team of Germany
Olympic bronze medalists for the United Team of Germany
Olympic medalists in football
Footballers at the 1964 Summer Olympics
Medalists at the 1964 Summer Olympics
1. FC Frankfurt players
DDR-Oberliga players
Footballers from Saxony-Anhalt